Endel Ratas (8 December 1938 Tarva, Pärnu County – 2 September 2006) was an Estonian freedom fighter and politician.

Since 1957 he was a member of Estonian Freedom Fighters' Union. From 1959 to 1963 he was in a prison camp in Mordva Republic, Russia.

In 1979, he was one of the fourth Estonians who signed Baltic Appeal. In 1988, he was a founding member of the Estonian National Independence Party (Eesti Rahvusliku Sõltumatuse Partei, or ERSP). In 1990 he was a member of the Congress of Estonia.

In 2000, he was awarded the Order of the National Coat of Arms, III Class. In 2006 he was awarded the Order of the White Star, II class.

References

1938 births
2006 deaths
Estonian independence activists
Estonian National Independence Party politicians
Recipients of the Order of the National Coat of Arms, 3rd Class
Recipients of the Order of the White Star, 2nd Class
Estonian prisoners and detainees
Gulag detainees
Prisoners and detainees of the Soviet Union
People from Põhja-Pärnumaa Parish